Nike produced a signature shoe line for the Oklahoma City, Golden State Warriors and now Brooklyn Nets superstar, Kevin Durant in 2008. The line is known for its price and its  on-court performance.  Nike signed Kevin Durant in 2007 for $60 million.

Nike Zoom KD

Released in 2008, the Nike Zoom KD featured a leather upper in a mid top form. The midsole featured Nike Zoom unit in the forefoot in a cushion midsole. Traction was provided with a solid rubber outsole with flex grooves. Some of the colorways released are:

OKC Home: January 1, 2009

White/Black/Silver: January 1, 2009

White/Black-Varsity Red-Silver: January 1, 2009

All Star: February 17, 2009

Boys and Girls Club: February 19, 2009

Drew Freeman Middleschool: February 19, 2009

Montrose: February 17, 2009

All American: February 19, 2009

Sonics: February 19, 2009

Texas: February 19, 2009

OKC Away: March 1, 2009

Texas Away: March 1, 2009

OKC Home: March 1, 2009

Nike Zoom KD II

Released in 2009, the Nike Zoom KD II featured leather upper, in a lowtop form with a midfoot strap. The midsole is the same as the Nike Zoom KD, but has lightweight Phylon in place. The Nike Zoom forefoot is still there to give the wearer cushion. The outsole is similar to what we saw in Zoom KD. Some of the colorways released are:

Creamsickle: January 15, 2010

OKC Away: January 16, 2010

OKC Home: January 23, 2010

All Star: February 6, 2010

Black/Black-Sport Red: March 1, 2010

White/Midnight Navy-Photo blue:March 1, 2010

Texas: March 27, 2010

White/Black-Photo Blue: April 1, 2010

AAU: May 1, 2010

China: June 5, 2010

Scoring Title: June 28, 2010

Nike Zoom KD III

Released in 2010, the Nike Zoom KD III featured Flywire along the lateral forefoot with leather and woven mesh. The tongue featured a pull ring, surrounded by the letter "d" of the KD logo. Along the medial midfoot, an "H" shaped strap that has two eyelets positioned by column to provide support and lockdown fit. The midsole featured a Nike Zoom forefoot unit encased in lightweight Phylon midsole. The outsole featured a solid rubber outsole with a herringbone pattern. The heel has a cutaway to reveal the Phylon midsole in the outsole for compression. There is a solid rubber wrapped around the heel for durability, but most wearers found it uncomfortable for some reason that when the heel strikes the floor, the foot ends up hitting the rubber piece, which is hard. Here are some of the released colorways:

OKC Away: November 26, 2010

X-Mas: December 21, 2010

OKC Home: December 23, 2010

White/Midnight Navy-Photo Blue White: January 8, 2011

TB: February 1, 2011

All Star: February 17, 2011

EA Sports: February 17, 2011

Redskins: March 6, 2011

Texas: March 18, 2011

Carbon Fiber: March 22, 2011

Wolf Grey/Del Sol-White: March 22, 2011

Scoring Title: August 20, 2011

Mike Miller: October 6, 2011

Nike Zoom KD IV

Released in 2011, the Nike Zoom KD IV has a Hyperfuse upper, and places the Adaptive Fit strap along the midfoot. The midsole featured the Nike Zoom forefoot unit and Phylon for cushioning. The outsole featured a storytelling pattern in the form of thunderbolts. Here are some of released colorways:

OKC Away: December 3, 2011

Black/Dark Grey: December 3, 2011

Weatherman: December 10, 2011

Nerf: December 17, 2011

X-Mas: December 26, 2011

Midnight Navy/White Team Orange: January 7, 2012

White/White-Black-Cool Grey: January 13, 2012

Year of the Dragon: January 17, 2012

OKC Home: January 27, 2012

Cool Grey/Del Sol White: January 27, 2012

TB: February 1, 2012

BHM Black History Month: February 11, 2012

All Star: February 24, 2012

Texas: March 17, 2012

Easter: April 6, 2012

Creamsickle: April 12, 2012

Entourage: April 21, 2012

Aunt Pearl: May 12, 2012

Undftd: May 14, 2012

N7: May 25, 2012

Scoring Title: July 21, 2012

USA: July 28, 2012

Gold Medal: September 29, 2012

Nike KD V

Released in 2012, the Nike Zoom KD V brought back the mid top upper with Hyperfuse and the Adaptive Fit lacing system. The midsole featured Nike Zoom forefoot, but is shaped like a bar to increase flexibility, and for the first time in the KD line, a 180 Air Max unit in the heel, placed in a lightweight Phylon midsole which also acts as a heel cup. The outsole featured storytelling pattern in the form of pentagons, which has five sides, and five is the number of the KD V, also is the second number in his jersey.

An elite version released on April 20, 2013. The elite version was a lowtop and featured Flywire upper with the Adaptive Fit lacing system, and an external carbon fiber heel counter. The midsole featured caged Nike Zoom heel unit along with the bar-shaped Nike Zoom forefoot unit. The outsole featured the same storytelling pattern as the original KD V, but was decoupled for range of motion. Here are some of released colorways:

OKC Away: December 8, 2012

DMV: December 15, 2012

X-Mas: December 26, 2012

Energy: December 31, 2012

Black/Blue Glow-Game Royal-Strata Grey: January 5, 2013

Black/Electric Green-Pine-Grey-Strata Grey: January 5, 2013

Black/Bright Crimson-University Red-Strata Grey: January 5, 2013

Black/Total Orange-Team Orange-Strata Grey: January 5, 2013

OKC Home: January 19, 2013

BHM Black History Month: January 26, 2013

Ice Blue: February 6, 2013

Birch: February 9, 2013

All Star: February 15, 2013

Texas: February 23, 2013

Hulk: March 9, 2013

Aunt Pearl: March 23, 2013

Easter: March 29, 2013

N7: April 13, 2013

WHAT THE: June 14, 2013

References

Shoes